Aarohanam is a 1980 Indian Malayalam film,  directed by A. Sheriff. The film stars Nedumudi Venu, Prathap Pothen, Jalaja and Kanakadurga in the lead roles. The film has musical score by Shyam.

Cast
Nedumudi Venu as Gopi
Prathap Pothen as Raju 
Jalaja as Photographer's wife 
Kanakadurga as Devi, Raju's stepmother
Surekha as Geetha
Vidhubala as Mini
KPAC Azeez as Raju's father
Bobby Kottarakkara as Ponnan
Jagathy as Photographer

Soundtrack
The music was composed by Shyam and the lyrics were written by Poovachal Khader.

References

External links
 

1980 films
1980s Malayalam-language films